A list of films produced by the Tollywood (Bengali language film industry) based in Kolkata in the year 1971.

A-Z of films

References

External links

1971
Bengali
Films, Bengali